Lasiochernes cretonatus is a species of pseudoscorpions discovered in the late 1990s in the Souré cave in Crete.

References

External link 

Fauna of Crete
Arachnids of Europe
Chernetidae
Animals described in 1998